Audley End railway station is on the West Anglia Main Line serving the village of Wendens Ambo and the town of Saffron Walden in Essex, England. Its three-letter station code is AUD.

The station is managed by Greater Anglia.

There was a platform at the eastern end of the station for a branch line to Saffron Walden that was closed in 1964.

History
The station was opened in 1845 by the Eastern Counties Railway, which was absorbed into the Great Eastern Railway, and became part of the London and North Eastern Railway during the grouping of 1923. The station passed on to the Eastern Region of British Railways on nationalisation in 1948.

The station was served by Network SouthEast when BR sectorisation was introduced in the 1980s, until it was privatised.

Audley End station's name was changed on signs to Audley End for Saffron Walden in 2012. Sir Alan Haselhurst, MP for Saffron Walden, unveiled the re-branded signs on Friday 25 May.

Services
Most services at Audley End are operated by Greater Anglia using  EMUs and  bi-mode trains.

The typical off-peak service in trains per hour is:
 2 tph to London Liverpool Street (1 semi-fast, 1 stopping)
 1 tph to 
 2 tph to 
 1 tph to  via 

References
References

Sources
 
 
 
 Sub Brit page about Saffron Walden Platform
 Station on navigable O.S. map

External links

Former Great Eastern Railway stations
Railway stations served by CrossCountry
Greater Anglia franchise railway stations
Railway stations in Essex
DfT Category D stations
Railway stations in Great Britain opened in 1845